Ricardo Martins Pereira commonly known as Ricardinho  is a football player who currently plays for Icasa. Ricardinho has been referred to in the Equatorial Guinean press as Ricardo Texeira Ondo.

Born in Brazil, Ricardinho represented Equatorial Guinea in a 2013 Africa Cup of Nations qualification game versus Democratic Republic of the Congo in October 2012. He scored on his international debut in a 2-1 victory over the Congolese side.

References

External links

1986 births
Living people
Footballers from São Paulo
Equatoguinean footballers
Equatorial Guinea international footballers
Brazilian footballers
Equatoguinean people of Brazilian descent
Clube Atlético Bragantino players
Clube de Regatas Brasil players
São Bernardo Futebol Clube players
Association football forwards